Thomas Ricks may refer to:
 Thomas E. Ricks (Mormon pioneer) (1828–1901), founder of Rexburg, Idaho
 Thomas E. Ricks (journalist) (born 1955), American journalist on defense topics

See also
Thomas F. Ricks House, National Register of Historic Places building in Eureka, California